Greece is a country of the Balkans, in Southeastern Europe, bordered to the north by Albania, North Macedonia and Bulgaria; to the east by Turkey, and is surrounded to the east by the Aegean Sea, to the south by the Cretan and the Libyan seas, and to the west by the Ionian Sea which separates Greece from Italy.

The country consists of a mountainous, peninsular mainland jutting out into the Mediterranean Sea at the southernmost tip of the Balkans, and two smaller peninsulas projecting from it:
the Chalkidiki and the Peloponnese, which is joined to the mainland by the Isthmus of Corinth. Greece also has many islands, of various sizes, the largest being Crete, Euboea, Lesvos, Rhodes, Chios, Kefalonia, and Corfu; groups of smaller islands include the Dodecanese and the Cyclades. According to the CIA World Factbook, Greece has  of coastline, the largest in the Mediterranean Basin.

Greece's latitude ranges from 35°N to 42°N and its longitude from 19°E to 28°E. As a result of this and its physical geography, the country has considerable climatic variation.

Physical geography
Greece is located in Southern Europe, bordering the Ionian Sea and the Mediterranean Sea, between Albania and Turkey. It is a peninsular country, with an archipelago of about 3,000 islands.

Land boundaries with Albania (212 km), North Macedonia (234 km), Bulgaria (472 km) and Turkey (192 km) measure approximately 1,110 km in total.
 
Greece's coastline measures .

80% of Greece is mountainous. The Pindus mountain range lies across the center of the country in a northwest-to-southeast direction, with a maximum elevation of 2,637 m. Extensions of the same mountain range stretch across the Peloponnese and underwater across the Aegean, forming many of the Aegean Islands including Crete, and joining with the Taurus Mountains of southern Turkey. Central and western Greece contain high and steep peaks intersected by many canyons and other karstic landscapes, including the Meteora and the Vikos Gorges – the latter being the world's deepest canyon in proportion to its width, and the third deepest after the Copper Canyon in Mexico and the Grand Canyon in the United States, plunging vertically for more than 1,100 metres.

Mount Olympus is the highest point in Greece, the 7th highest and the 9th most prominent mountain in mainland Europe (together with Gerlachovský štít and including Großglockner as a separate mountain), rising to 2,917 m above sea level. The Rhodope Mountains form the border between Greece and Bulgaria; that area is covered with vast and thick forests.

Greece's lowest point is sea level.

Plains are found in eastern Thessaly, in central Macedonia and in Thrace.

Extremities of Greece 
The extreme points of Greece are 
North: Ormenio village (41°45′41″ N, 26°13′15″ E)
South: Gavdos island (34°48′11″ N, 24°07′25″ E)
East: Strongyli island (36°06′17″ N, 29°38′39″ E)
West: Othonoi island (39°51′11″ N, 19°22′41″ E)

Mainland
Mainland Greece forms the southernmost part of the Balkan peninsula with two additional smaller peninsulas projecting from it: the Chalkidiki and the Peloponnese. The north of the country includes the regions of Macedonia and Thrace. To the south the mainland narrows and includes the regions of Epirus, Thessaly and Central Greece, where the region of Attica and the capital city Athens are located. Further south, the smaller peninsula of Peloponnese is separated from the rest of the Greek mainland by the Corinthian and Saronic Gulfs, but joined by the Isthmus of Corinth.

Mainland Greece covers about 80% of the total territory and is largely mountainous. The largest mountain range of Greece is the Pindus range, the southern extension of the Dinaric Alps, which forms the spine of the Greek mainland, separating Epirus from Thessaly and Macedonia. The country's tallest mountain is Mount Olympus, which also separates Thessaly from Macedonia. Its highest peak rises to 2,918 m above sea level, making it the second highest of the Balkan peninsula after Musala in the Rila Mountain.

The number of islands vary between 1,200 and 6,000. A figure frequently cited in travel guides is 1,425 islands, of which 166 are said to be inhabited. The Greek Tourism Organization reports a figure of 6,000, with 227 of them inhabited. Paris Match, however, raises this number to 9,841 islands, of which only 169 have a recorded continuous human presence.

The Greek islands account for about 20% of the country's total territory, and vary greatly in size as well as in climate. The country's largest island is Crete, with Euboea being second largest. Other large Greek islands include Rhodes and Lesbos in the Aegean Sea, and Corfu and Cephalonia in the Ionian Sea. Many of the smaller Greek islands form groups or chains, often called archipelagos, with notable examples being the Cyclades and the Sporades in the south and central Aegean Sea respectively.

Aegean

The islands of the Aegean Sea are situated between mainland Greece to the west and north, Anatolia to the east and the island of Crete to the south. Traditionally, the islands are classified into seven groups, from north to south:

 North Aegean Islands
 Sporades
 Euboea
 Saronic Islands
 Cyclades
 Dodecanese (Southern Sporades)
 Crete

Ionian Islands

The Ionian Islands are a group of seven islands. The six northern islands lie off the western coast of Greece, in the Ionian Sea. The other island, Kythira, lies off the southern tip of the Peloponnese. Kythira is part of the modern administrative region of Attica, not the Ionian Islands (Ionioi Nisoi). The Ionian Islands are distinct from the historical region of Ionia, which is today part of western Turkey.

Crete

Crete is the largest island of Greece and the second largest in the Eastern Mediterranean, after Cyprus. The island spans 260 km from east to west and 60 km from north to south at its widest. The island narrows in the region close to Ierapetra, where it is only 12 km wide. It is surrounded to the north by the Sea of Crete; to the south by the Libyan Sea; to the west by the Myrtoan Sea; and to the east by the Karpathion Sea. It lies about 160 km south of the Greek mainland.

Crete is characterized by a mountain range crossing from west to east, formed by three different subranges:
The White Mountains or Lefka Ori (2,452 m);
The Idi Range (Psiloritis 2,456 m);
The Dikti Mountains (2,148 m)
These encompass fertile plateaus, such as Lasithi, Omalos and Nidha; caves such as Diktaion and Idaion; and gorges such as the Samariá Gorge. The protected area of the Samariá Gorge is the home of the Cretan goat, or kri-kri, while the endangered Bearded vulture or lammergeyer lives in the Cretan mountains and gorges.

Crete's rivers include the Ieropotamos River in the southern part of the island.

Land use
Arable land: 19.71%
Permanent crops: 8.95%
Other: 71.37% (2012 est.)

Irrigated land: 15,550 km2 (2007)

Environment

Greece is a mostly mountainous country with a very long coastline, filled with peninsulas and islands.

The climate can range from semi-desert to cold climate mountain forests.

Greece's natural hazards include severe earthquakes, floods, droughts and wildfires. Current environmental issues in Greece include air pollution and water pollution.

Gallery

See also
 Geography of Europe
 Greek names of mountains
 List of earthquakes in Greece
 List of islands of Greece
 National parks of Greece
 Wildlife of Greece

Notes

References

Further reading

 A Geological Companion to Greece and the Aegean by Michael and Reynold Higgins, Cornell University Press, 1996